The Madison metropolitan area may refer to:

The Madison, Wisconsin, metropolitan area, United States
The Madison, Indiana micropolitan area, United States

See also
Madison (disambiguation)